The Orbelian lords of the province of Syunik were a noble family of Armenia, with a long history of political influence documented in inscriptions throughout the provinces of Vayots Dzor and Syunik, and recorded by the family historian Bishop Stepanos in his 1297 History of Syunik.

Through the 12th century, the Orbelians were a major feudal family in Georgia, with their home base the fortress of Orbet'i in southern Georgia. In 1177/8, their leader Ivane led his whole extended clan on the losing side in a power struggle between the deceased king's young heir, Ivane's protégé and son-in-law Demetre, and the king's brother Giorgi. Ivane sent his brother Liparit and nephews Elikum and Ivane to the Persians in Tabriz for help, but this new army came too late, after Ivane had been blinded, his family strangled, and young Demetre blinded and castrated.

Liparit died in exile. One son, Ivane, returned to Georgia when the situation cooled down; his descendants, on their dwindled estates, stayed prominent in Georgia and even the USSR. Honored by the Persian atabek, other son Elikum stayed and became an important official, converting to Islam  and dying in one of the atabek's wars. He left behind a widow, sister of an Armenian bishop of Syunik, and a young son Liparit. These quickly became, involuntarily, the wife and stepson of a Muslim notable in Nakhchivan.

In 1211 a combined Armenian and Georgian army under Zakare  and Ivane Mkhargrdzeli wrested control of Syunik from the Ildenizid atabeg state. Remembering the Orbelians—whose dominant role in Georgia the Mkhargrdzelis had since filled—Ivane made a search, located Liparit thanks to the bishop brother-in-law, and established him as feudal lord of Vayots Dzor. Bolstered by marriage alliances with its feudal relations the Khaghbakians or Proshians and others, the Orbelians flourished, building or supporting a network of fine monasteries (most notable of which is Noravank, historically important manuscripts, and inscribed khachkars. Every medieval monastery in Vayots Dzor bears inscriptions recording their patronage.

The Mongol arrival imposed the need for fast footwork. In 1251 and 1256, the prudent and multi-lingual Orbelian prince Smbat made arduous pilgrimages to Karakorum, armed with a splendid jewel and divine blessing, and persuaded Möngke Khan, son of Genghis, the Mongol ruler, to make Syunik and its churches a tax-exempt fiefdom under Mangu's (or at least his Christian mother's) direct patronage. The family expanded its influence, helped by an apparently genuine and reciprocated liking and respect for the Mongols, at least until the Mongols converted to Islam. In 1286, the scholar of the family, the historian Stepanos, made the pilgrimage to the Western Armenian kingdom in Cilicia and was made Metropolitan—presiding archbishop—of the newly amplified See of Syunik.

The fiefdom was divided in three from 1290-1300, then reunited by Burtel, who ruled a flourishing principality and was ultimately named Mayor/Amir of the Mongol capitals Sultania and Tabriz. This close cooperation with the Mongol rulers had its price. Several Orbelians died on the Khan's campaigns far from home, and one spent 12 years a captive in Egypt before being ransomed. The Orbelians survived the arrival of Timur Lenk and his Turkmen hordes in the 1380s, but in the collapse of Timur's empire into warring factions, Smbat, the last firm Orbelian ruler of Syunik, chose the wrong side and, on the capture of his stronghold of Vorotnaberd (south of Sisian) in 1410, decamped for Georgia where he died. Orbelians managed to retain property in Vayots Dzor throughout the 15th century, though many of them emigrated to their relatives in Georgia.

References

Orbelian family
Princes of Syunik